Surgeon General Sir Anthony Dickson Home VC KCB (30 November 1826 – 10 August 1914) was a Scottish recipient of the Victoria Cross, the highest and most prestigious award for gallantry in the face of the enemy that can be awarded to British and Commonwealth forces.

Biography

Home graduated from the University of St Andrews School of Medicine with an MD in 1848. Home was 30 years old, and a surgeon in the 90th Foot, British Army during the Indian Mutiny on 26 September 1857 at the Relief of Lucknow, India, when the following deed took place for which he was awarded the VC:

 

In the early 1860s, Home was stationed in New Zealand and fought in the New Zealand Wars. He was awarded a Knight Commander of the Order of the Bath and achieved the rank of surgeon general.

Arthur Conan Doyle worked with him a few times and stated that, "..he seemed a most disagreeable old man...and yet when I married shortly afterwards he sent me a most charming message wishing me good fortune..."

Home died on 10 August 1914 and was buried on the western side of Highgate Cemetery.

The medal
His Victoria Cross is displayed at the Army Medical Services Museum, Mytchett, Surrey.

Works
Service Memoirs

References

Monuments to Courage (David Harvey, 1999)
The Register of the Victoria Cross (This England, 1997)
Scotland's Forgotten Valour (Graham Ross, 1995)

External links
Location of grave and VC medal (N. London)

1826 births
1914 deaths
British recipients of the Victoria Cross
Cameronians officers
Knights Commander of the Order of the Bath
Indian Rebellion of 1857 recipients of the Victoria Cross
British Army regimental surgeons
People from Dunbar
British Army personnel of the Crimean War
British Army personnel of the Second Opium War
British military personnel of the New Zealand Wars
Burials at Highgate Cemetery
West India Regiment officers
8th King's Royal Irish Hussars officers
13th Hussars officers
35th Regiment of Foot officers
Seaforth Highlanders officers
British military personnel of the Third Anglo-Ashanti War
Alumni of the University of St Andrews
British Army recipients of the Victoria Cross